The Oval Raceway, also known as the Angmering Motor Sports Centre or Angmering Raceway is a motor racing circuit on the outskirts of Angmering, near Worthing, West Sussex in the United Kingdom.

The  site was started by local man Jim Hazelgrove and is focused on a  concrete banked oval track, inside of which is a smaller circuit for go-karts, mini motos and pit bikes.  The main track primarily hosts stock car, hot rod and banger racing, as well as special events such as demolition derbys caravan racing and car jumps.

Types of racing
The primary type of racing at the track is the racing of stock cars on the banked concrete oval, and this has a number of subdivisions including hot rods, saloon stock cars and bangers.

There are also races of specialist classes such as classic stock cars.

External links
 Oval Race Club official website

References

Stock car racing venues
Kart circuits
Sports venues in West Sussex